Parque de las Ciencias is a science centre and museum, part of the European Network of Science Centers and Museums (ECSITE), located in the city of Granada, Andalusia, Spain. Under the motto "A new kind of Museum", Parque de las Ciencias was founded in 1990 and opened in 1995. The museum has been solely directed by Ernesto Páramo Sureda since its establishment and its successive expansions.  It occupies 70,000 m2 and holds permanent and temporary exhibitions including: a planetarium, educational facilities, café, restaurant, bookshop, library, cinemas, etc.  It also has a cultural gallery ranging from 50 to 550 in number. Some of the museum’s highlights are its Plastination Lab and Restoration and Production Workshops.

Parque de las Ciencias council members consists of: The University of Granada, The Spanish National Research Council (CSIC), the local provincial and regional governments and The Caja Granada Foundation. Some of the museum’s exhibitions are its 'Windows to Science' and 'Live Science', which through crystal bounded spaces, provides the visitors with the experience of being in an actual lab.

Contents

Macroscopio building 
Macroscopio building is the fourth phase of Parque de las Ciencias and was designed by the architect Carlos Ferrater. The various exhibition areas lead off the large entrance hall:

Journey to the Human Body Pavilion 
This hall focuses on health and everything related to life and their own lives. In a society where people have more time for recreational activities, higher levels of education and a longer average lifespan, the general public has become much more interested in health, medical sciences and new bio-health technologies.
The hall aims to promote awareness of what is currently known about health and life sciences by providing a general overview of the field, linking the different sciences and techniques involved: these include the human body, anatomical sciences, the study of the senses, biomedicine, transplant operations, new medicines, genetics and the genetic engineering revolution, food, understanding relationships between living things and their environment, life expectancy, etc... Life sciences are exceptionally important today and a great deal of interdisciplinary research is being carried out into the field.
Discovering how the human body works has always been a tremendous intellectual and scientific challenge. Knowledge has allowed scientists to carry out exhaustive research into illnesses, disorders, functional anomalies and deformities which have, for many years, caused suffering and death. The history of medicine is, on the one hand, the history of humans’ persistent curiosity and desire to understand the world, and, on the other, the history of the struggle between illnesses and the longing to be as healthy and well as possible.
The hall also includes exhibits on the development of techniques used in science related to health, life, and the study of human beings: instruments and methods used to represent the body using models, recordings or photographs, as well as some of the most modern examination techniques, microscopic displays, digital simulation, etc. Because the exhibits are scientific and educational, the hall strikes a balance between highly valuable historical objects and exhibits and real organs, interactive experiments, virtual reality, IT models, scale models, scenographic exhibits, reproductions, videos, workshops, etc.

The contents of the hall have been designed taking into account the inter-relationships between life and health sciences and physical sciences (pulleys, levers, slanted surfaces, energies...) and the chemistry of life.

Risk Prevention Hall 
This hall is a fun, interactive teaching space, full of exhibits which help visitors to understand the wide range of different risks and hazards to which we are exposed. The exhibits use elements and materials which are easy for visitors to understand and get close to, such as simulators, symbols, audiovisual exhibits, etc... Visitors walk around set routes which show situations where risk agents are present. These risk agents can harm the human body if they come into contact with it, and they are grouped according to production and social sectors. Each route shows how vulnerable our bodies are in both physical and psychological terms. This pavilion was awarded in 2013 by DASA Arbeitswelt Ausstellung Museum.

Al-Andalus and Science Pavilion 
The scientific and technological legacy of al-Andalus brought to life.

Techno-Forum Pavilion 
An area for new technologies, innovation and art.

Temporary Exhibitions

Explore the Museum's Treasure Trove Hall 
This makes science accessible to young children through discovery and exploration.

Foucault Pendulum Building 

This is one of the most emblematic buildings in the Parque de las Ciencias complex. This was the first part of the museum and it was opened in May 1995. It houses a great deal of the museum’s content in its four permanent exhibition halls: the Biosphere, Eureka, Perception and Explora halls. The Planetarium is also located in this building. It was designed by architects Francisco Pastor and Francisco Maeso.

Biosphere 
This hall contains exhibits related to life on Earth. Modules designed using the latest in contemporary museum technology take visitors on a journey to deepen their understanding of the planet on which we live.

Perception 
This hall is linked to the world of the senses. Light and sound, and the relationship between these phenomena and the way in which we can perceive them, are the key elements studied by the modules in this hall.

Explora 
This part of the museum is aimed at visitors between 3 and 7 years of age. Exhibits have been specially designed to bring children closer to science: scales, dice, water games, sound, self-perception, etc...

Eureka 
This hall gives visitors the chance to experience physical phenomena and solve problems using interactive exhibits. Gyroscopes, levers, pendulums, the Venturi effect, gears.... these are just some examples of the experiments which give visitors the chance to have fun while they learn.

Planetarium 
The Planetarium has a 10 m dome and is equipped with 120 projectors which recreate the night sky and its more than 7,000 stars. This is a real treat for astronomers these days, as it is becoming more and more difficult to see the sky so clearly in our cities.

Outdoors 
The Parque de las Ciencias also has outdoor exhibits in 27,000 m² of garden areas. This is one of the things that sets its apart from other museums, as it takes advantage of the good Andalusian weather to bring its exhibits outside.

Birds of Prey in Flight Workshop 
In this workshop visitors can experience an eagle swooping past just a few centimetres away and see a falcon hunting its prey. They can also learn what a vulture has to eat, and how owls fly. The workshop is split into two parts: a teaching session, when they will see the birds and find out about their biology and ecology, and a flying display, when they will be able to see them soar, hunt and eat.
The workshop also emphasizes the important role that birds of prey play in keeping ecosystems healthy, and explains why conservation is so important.

Tropical Butterfly House 
The Butterfly House recreates the tropical climate The temperature inside the Butterfly House ranges between 21 and 24 °C with a humidity of 70%, just perfect for the 20 species of butterfly from South-East Asia, Central and South America and Tropical Africa and the more than 40 species of tropical and subtropical plants. The life cycle of these insects can be seen from the moment the caterpillars hatch until they turn into butterflies.

Observation Tower 

This is one of the most emblematic pieces of architecture in the Parque de las Ciencias complex. The tower is 50 metres high and has a viewing terrace which looks out onto the nearby Mulhacén mountain – an unbeatable viewpoint over Granada.

Astronomical Observatory 
This building is home to a Steavenson telescope with a 75 cm-wide mirror. This telescope was donated by the Institute of Astrophysics of Andalusia. The Observatory is the venue for the monthly “Nights of Astronomy” programme, and is also perfect for watching eclipses, meteor showers, etc....

Natural Spaces Hall 
RENPA Permanent exhibition created by the Ministry of the Environment of the Autonomous Government of Andalusia, on Andalusia’s Protected Natural Spaces, characteristic ecosystems, flora, fauna, geology and landscapes.

Botanical Walks 
Four spaces which show different aspects of the biology, typology and diversity of Mediterranean plants and the relationships between them, the animal world and the landscape. Visitors can see more than 300 different plant species as they follow the pathways.

Plant Maze 
Plant walk around paths and squares with different themes: water, sand and flowers.

Scientific and Technological Heritage 
The museum also focuses on scientific and industrial heritage, using historical pieces to show visitors the technological changes that have taken place over the last few centuries.

Water Games 
The mechanisms which have been invented since ancient times to transport and elevate water also have their own place in the Parque de las Ciencias.

Astronomy Garden 
This garden contains a collection of observation instruments used throughout history, as well as models designed to follow the relative movements of the Sun, the Earth, the Moon and the stars.

Mental Gymnastics Tent 
A giant chess board, the Towers of Hanoi, a Möbius Strip, jigsaws and topological puzzles – these are just some of the brainteasers found in the museum gardens which visitors can use to give their brains a workout.

BioDome 

The BioDome is a museum facility dedicated to the education, conservation, and research of planet Earth's biodiversity. It was inaugurated in July 2016 and recreates different habitats in the tropical fringe of the planet, housing around 250 species of animals and plants, mainly from the Amazon, Madagascar and different areas of the Indo-Pacific area, like the Mekong River or the Sulawesi.

The pavilion houses three routes: one underwater, with different aquariums that show the diversity of species in both marine and river ecosystems; another terrestrial, where visitors find different species of mammals such as ring-tailed lemurs or reptiles such as the Chinese alligator , and recreations of habitats such as mangroves or rice fields. In the aerial route, there are birds such as the white-breasted toucan among species such as the two-toed sloth or amphibians such as arrowhead frogs.

The objectives of this space are education on the importance of biodiversity and the maintenance of these ecosystems for the sustainability of the planet, together with support for conservation projects, both within the BioDome and in the places of origin themselves. Furthermore, its facilities contribute to the development of research projects that are carried out in transparent laboratories for visitors.

References

External links 
 Official website of Parque de las Ciencias
 Reviews on Tripadvisor

Museums in Granada
Science museums in Spain